Young-Leach Cobblestone Farmhouse and Barn Complex is a historic home located at Torrey in Yates County, New York.  The farmhouse was built about 1836 and is a large late Federal / early Greek Revival style cobblestone structure.  It is built of variously colored and shaped field cobbles. The farmhouse is among the nine surviving cobblestone buildings in Yates County.  The barn complex includes two barns, a shed, machine shed, and a corn crib.

It was listed on the National Register of Historic Places in 1992.

References

Houses on the National Register of Historic Places in New York (state)
Cobblestone architecture
Federal architecture in New York (state)
Houses in Yates County, New York
National Register of Historic Places in Yates County, New York
Barns on the National Register of Historic Places in New York (state)